Shellfish is a colloquial and fisheries term for exoskeleton-bearing aquatic invertebrates used as food, including various species of molluscs, crustaceans, and echinoderms. Although most kinds of shellfish are harvested from saltwater environments, some are found in freshwater. In addition, a few species of land crabs are eaten, for example Cardisoma guanhumi in the Caribbean.  Shellfish are among the most common food allergens.

Despite the name, shellfish are not fish. Most shellfish are low on the food chain and eat a diet composed primarily of phytoplankton and zooplankton. Many varieties of shellfish, and crustaceans in particular, are actually closely related to insects and arachnids; crustaceans make up one of the main subphyla of the phylum Arthropoda. Molluscs include cephalopods (squids, octopuses, cuttlefish) and bivalves (clams, oysters), as well as gastropods (aquatic species such as whelks and winkles; land species such as snails and slugs).

Molluscs used as a food source by humans include many species of clams, mussels, oysters, winkles, and scallops. Some crustaceans that are commonly eaten are shrimp, lobsters, crayfish, crabs and barnacles. Echinoderms are not as frequently harvested for food as molluscs and crustaceans; however, sea urchin roe is quite popular in many parts of the world, where the live delicacy is harder to transport.

Though some shellfish harvesting has been unsustainable, and shrimp farming has been destructive in some parts of the world, shellfish farming can be important to environmental restoration, by developing reefs, filtering water and eating biomass.

Terminology
The term "shellfish" is used both broadly and specifically. In common parlance, as in "having shellfish for dinner", it can refer to anything from clams and oysters to lobster and shrimp. For regulatory purposes it is often narrowly defined as filter-feeding molluscs such as clams, mussels, and oyster to the exclusion of crustaceans and all else.

Although the term is primarily applied to marine species, edible freshwater invertebrates such as crayfish and river mussels are also sometimes grouped under the umbrella term "shellfish".

Although their shells may differ, all shellfish are invertebrates.  As non-mammalian animals that spend their entire lives in water they are "fish" in an informal sense; however, the term ”finfish" is sometimes used to distinguish fish, animals defined by having vertebrae, from shellfish in modern terminology.

The word "shellfish" is both singular and plural; the rarely used "shellfishes" is sometimes employed to distinguish among various types of shellfish.

Shellfish in various cuisines
Archaeological finds have shown that humans have been making use of shellfish as a food item for hundreds of thousands of years. In the present, shellfish dishes are a feature of almost all the cuisines of the world, providing an important source of protein in many cuisines around the world, especially in the countries with coastal areas.

In Japan
In the Japanese cuisine, chefs often use shellfish and their roe in different dishes. Sushi (vinegared rice, topped with other ingredients, including shellfish, fish, meat and vegetables) features both raw and cooked shellfish.  Sashimi primarily consists of very fresh raw seafood, sliced into thin pieces. Both sushi and sashimi are served with soy sauce and wasabi paste (a Japanese horseradish root, a spice with extremely strong, hot flavor), thinly sliced pickled ginger root, and a simple garnish such as shiso (a kitchen herb, member of the mint family) or finely shredded daikon radish, or both.

In the United States

Lobster in particular is a great delicacy in the United States, where families in the Northeast region make them into the centerpiece of a clam bake, usually for special occasions. Lobsters are eaten on much of the East Coast; the American lobster ranges from Newfoundland down to about the Carolinas, but is most often associated with Maine. A typical meal involves boiling the lobster with some slight seasoning and then serving it with drawn butter, baked potato, and corn on the cob.

Clamming is done both commercially and recreationally along the Northeast coastline of the US. Various type of clams are incorporated into the cuisine of New England. The soft-shelled clam is eaten either fried or steamed (and then called "steamers"). Many types of clams can be used for clam chowder, but the quahog, a hard shelled clam also known as a chowder clam, is often used because the long cooking time softens its tougher meat.

The Chesapeake Bay and Maryland region has generally been associated more with crabs, but in recent years the area has been trying to reduce its catch of blue crabs, as wild populations have been depleted.  This has not, however, stemmed the demand: Maryland-style crabcakes are still a well known treat in crabhouses all over the bay, though the catch now comes from points farther south.

In the Southeast, and particularly the gulf states, shrimping is an important industry. Copious amounts of shrimp are harvested each year in the Gulf of Mexico and the Atlantic Ocean to satisfy a national demand for shrimp. Locally, prawns and shrimp are often deep fried; in the Cajun and Creole kitchens of Louisiana, shrimp and prawns are a common addition to traditional recipes like jambalaya and certain stews. Crawfish are a well known and much eaten delicacy there, often boiled in huge pots and heavily spiced.

In many major cities with active fishing ports, raw oyster bars are also a feature of shellfish consumption. When served freshly shucked (opened) and iced, one may find a liquid inside the shell, called the liquor. Some believe that oysters have the properties of an aphrodisiac.

Inter-tidal herbivorous shellfish such as mussels and clams can help people reach a healthy balance of omega-3 and omega-6 fats in their diets, instead of the current Western diets. For this reason, the eating of shellfish is often encouraged by dietitians.

Some popular dishes using shellfish:
 Ceviche
 Cioppino
 Clam chowder
 Curanto
 Fruits de mer
 Paella
 Sashimi and Sushi
 Shrimp cocktail
 Lobster bisque
 She-crab soup

Religious dietary restrictions

The Torah forbids the consumption of shellfish (i.e. the only permitted seafood is fish with fins and scales), in the books of Leviticus and Deuteronomy. Jews (of all religious traditions) who fully observe the dietary laws thus do not eat shellfish.  Neither do Seventh-day Adventists, who follow Jewish dietary law.

Shia Islamic schools of thought vary on whether (and which types of) shellfish may be acceptable. While Sunni Muslims view them as halal.

Allergy 

Approximately 1% of the population is estimated to suffer from shellfish allergy, which is more common in teenage and adult life than very early childhood.

Toxic content 
Some shellfish, such as whelk, contain arsenic.

Shellfish caught in Alaska can lead to paralytic shellfish poisoning (PSP).
PSP is caused by toxins namely Saxitoxins released by dinoflagellate, a type of protista(also considered algae), which are extremely poisonous (1000 times more potent than cyanide) and can lead to death by paralyzing the breathing muscles.
Due to warming oceans algae blooms have become more widespread, thereby increasing the likelihood of intoxications of various types.

Ecosystem services and reef-building 
Shellfish of various kinds contribute to the formation of reefs, such as when millions of oysters or mussels aggregate together. Reefs provide habitat for numerous other species, bury carbon, contributing to climate change mitigation, and defend the shore against erosion, floods and waves. Conversely, when they are destroyed or exploited, carbon can be released into the atmosphere, simultaneously increasing the likelihood of severe weather while removing the natural defence against its consequences. In addition, some shellfish are known for filtering water, removing suspended particles and contaminants, which contributes to both quality and clarity. These benefits cascade to other species that are helpful to humankind such as seagrasses.

See also 
 Aquaculture
 Seafood
 Seashell
 Shellfish Association of Great Britain (SAGB)

References

Sources 

 Pawley, Andrew (2004) "Are crustaceans shellfish? A whiff of scandal in English lexicography" Australian Style, 12 (1): 1–3.

External links

 BC Shellfish Growers Association
 East Coast Shellfish Growers Association
 Pacific Coast Shellfish Growers Association
 Shellfish News
 Shellfish Gallery
 Shellfish Guide 
 Freshwater and Marine Image Bank—Shellfish at the University of Washington Libraries, Digital Collection
 Nutrition Facts for Various Shellfish

Seafood
Fish products